Loick Mark Essien is an English singer signed to record label Sony Music. Essien began his musical career after featuring on rapper Chipmunk's single "Beast". Essien was set to release his debut album, Identity, on 5 March 2012 but was dropped from his label weeks before the release date.

Personal life
He studied vocals at The Institute of Contemporary Music Performance. His father is Nigerian and his mother is Ghanaian.

Career
Essien began his musical career in 2007 when he sang the chorus on Bashy's controversial track, "Black Boys". Essien was uncredited on the track, however. His next appearance was in 2008 when he appeared on rapper Chipmunk's debut single "Beast". The single, released on 8 October 2008, debuted at number 181 in the UK Singles Chart and later appeared on the album I Am Chipmunk. Essien also featured on artist Bashy's lead single from his upcoming second album, "When the Sky Falls". The single, which was released independently on 12 March 2010, debuted at number 114 in the United Kingdom. On 12 October 2010, Essien released his debut solo single "Love Drunk" in the United Kingdom through Sony Music, where it debuted at number 56 in the UK chart. It was then confirmed in February 2011 that Essien would release his debut album, entitled Identity later that year. The second single to be released from the album, entitled "Stuttering" was released on 6 February 2011 and featured rap group N-Dubz, although only Dappy and Fazer appeared in the single's accompanying music video. The single marked Essien's top 40 debut, when it charted at number 36 on the UK Singles Chart.

Essien released his third single "How We Roll" featuring singer Tanya Lacey on 3 July 2011. It entered at number two in the UK Singles Chart to become his biggest hit to date. It sold 52,010 copies in its first week. His fourth single from forthcoming album Identity called "Me Without You" was released on 6 November 2011 it debuted and peaked at number 14. On 3 October 2011, he appeared as a guest on Never Mind the Buzzcocks. Loick is now signed to Insanity Records (Sony Music)

Discography

Mixtapes

Singles

As featured artist

Guest appearances

References

External links
 

21st-century Black British male singers
British contemporary R&B singers
Living people
20th-century births
People from Harrow, London
Year of birth missing (living people)